The 1962 Dwars door België was the 18th edition of the Dwars door Vlaanderen cycle race and was held on 21–22 April 1962. The race started and finished in Waregem. The race was won by Martin Van Geneugden.

General classification

References

1962
1962 in road cycling
1962 in Belgian sport